The Bolen Building, located at 85 W. Main St. in Hindman, Kentucky, was built in 1939–1942.  It was listed on the National Register of Historic Places in 2007.

It is a two-story, stone commercial building, with construction typical for stone buildings in Hindman. Its storefront appears to be original, and includes a recessed single-door entry with angled windows.

It is also a contributing building in the Hindman Historic District, which was listed on the National Register in 2013.

In 2018 the building is an art gallery, the Appalachian Artisan Center.

References

External links 
 Appalachian Artisan Center website

Commercial buildings on the National Register of Historic Places in Kentucky
Commercial buildings completed in 1939
National Register of Historic Places in Knott County, Kentucky
1939 establishments in Kentucky
Individually listed contributing properties to historic districts on the National Register in Kentucky
Hindman, Kentucky